Roo is a fictional character in the Winnie-the-Pooh stories.

Roo or ROO may also refer to:

People
 Ago Roo (born 1946), Estonian actor
 Andrés Quintana Roo (1787-1851), Mexican liberal politician and author
 Jo de Roo (born 1937), Dutch former road racing cyclist
 Remi De Roo (born 1924), Canadian retired Roman Catholic bishop
 Roo Borson, pen name of Canadian poet Ruth Elizabeth Borson (born 1952)
 Roo Dorr (1909-c. 1961), Australian rugby union player nicknamed "Roo"
 Nick Riewoldt (born 1982), Australian rules footballer nicknamed "Roo"
 Wayne Rooney (born 1985), English football player nicknamed "Roo"

Fictional characters
 Auntie Roo, in the 1961 film Whoever Slew Auntie Roo?
 Roo Stewart, in the Australian soap opera Home and Away

Other uses
 Roo, shortened name for kangaroo
 ROO, IATA code for Rondonópolis Airport, Brazil
 ROO, ISO 639-3 code for the Rotokas language, spoken on the island of Bougainville, Papua New Guinea
 Roo bar or bull bar, a protective device for a motor vehicle
 RoO, abbreviation of Rules of origin in international trade

See also
 Roe (disambiguation)
 Roos (disambiguation)
 Roux (disambiguation)
 Rou, Norman name of Rollo, 10th century Viking leader, first ruler of Normandy
 Rooing, a variation of sheep shearing where the fleece is plucked by hand 
 Rewe (disambiguation)
 Rew (disambiguation)
 Ru (disambiguation)
 Rue (disambiguation)

Lists of people by nickname